The 1936–37 National Football League was the 10th staging of the National Football League, an annual Gaelic football tournament for the Gaelic Athletic Association county teams of Ireland.

Mayo won the league for the fourth year in a row, beating Meath in the final.

Format 
There were two divisions – Division 1 and Division 2.

Division 1 was split into two Groups, A (east) and B (west). Group winners played off for the NFL title.

Division 2 was split into two Groups. Group winners played off for the NFL (Division 2) title.

Division 1

Group A

Table

Group B

Table

Final

Division 2

Group A
 won.

Group B
 won.

Final

References

National Football League
National Football League
National Football League (Ireland) seasons